Nanda Nath Saikia College, established in 1959, is one of the oldest undergraduate, coeducational college situated at Titabar, in Jorhat district, Assam. This college is affiliated with the Dibrugarh University.

Departments

Science
Physics
Mathematics
Chemistry
Computer Application
Botany
Zoology

Arts
 Assamese
 English
History
Education
Economics
Political Science
Geography

References

External links

Universities and colleges in Assam
Colleges affiliated to Dibrugarh University
Educational institutions established in 1959
1959 establishments in Assam